Piamonte may refer to:

 Piamonte, town and municipality in the Cauca Department, Colombia
 Alberto Jover Piamonte, Roman Catholic Archbishop of Jaro in the Philippines
 Giovanni di Piamonte, 15th-century Italian painter

See also 

 Piemonte  (disambiguation)
 Piemont (disambiguation)